City of St. Petersburg is a roll-on/roll-off, pure car carrier cargo ship made for Nissan Motor Company Ltd, designed with a sleek semi-spherical prow to reduce wind resistance, thus saving 800 tons of fuel annually.

See also 
Nichioh Maru, Nissan's domestic car carrier

References

External links 

 Nissan unveils the City of St. Petersburg; an eco-friendly Leaf transport ship

Ships built in Japan
Ro-ro ships
2010 ships